The North Zone cricket team is a first-class cricket team that represents northern India in the Duleep Trophy and Deodhar Trophy. It is a composite team of players from six first-class Indian teams from northern India competing in the Ranji Trophy: Delhi, Haryana, Himachal Pradesh, Jammu and Kashmir, Punjab and Services. North Zone has the strongest track record of all the zones in the Duleep Trophy, as they have won the Trophy 17 times, with the next best team, West Zone having won 16 times. They hold the record for the most consecutive titles, five, from 1990-91 through to 1994-95.

Current squad

Notable players from North Zone

Kapil Dev
Gautam Gambhir
Dinesh Mongia
Virender Sehwag
Ishant Sharma
Navjot Singh Sidhu
Harbhajan Singh
Yuvraj Singh
Lala Amarnath
Surinder Amarnath
Mohinder Amarnath
Virat Kohli
Bishen Singh Bedi
Aakash Chopra

North Zone also had the services of some very famous Pakistani cricketers before partition, such as
 Dr Jehangir Khan
 Dilawar Hussain
 Gul Mohammad
 Nazar Mohammad
 A H Kardar
 Fazal Mahmood
 Imtiaz Ahmed
 Akshay Patel

External links
 Lists of matches played by North Zone at CricketArchive

Indian first-class cricket teams